The season began in August 2012 and ended in June 2013.
Ilirska Bistrica and Stojnci withdrew after the 2011–12 season.

Clubs East

League standing

Clubs West

1 Gažon declined promotion.

League standing

See also
2012–13 Slovenian Second League

External links
Football Association of Slovenia 
MNZ Lendava 
MNZ Ljubljana 

Slovenian Third League seasons
3
Slovenia